Izhar ul Haq may refer to:
 Izhar ul-Haqq, book by Rahmatullah Kairanawi
 Muhammad Izhar ul Haq, Urdu columnist and poet